Tinea munita is a species of moth in the family Tineidae first described by Edward Meyrick in 1932. However the placement of this species within the genus Tinea is in doubt.  As a result, this species may be referred to as Tinea (s.l.) munita. This species is endemic to New Zealand.

References

Moths described in 1932
Tineinae
Moths of New Zealand
Endemic fauna of New Zealand
Taxa named by Edward Meyrick
Endemic moths of New Zealand